Idalus intermedia is a moth of the family Erebidae. It was described by Walter Rothschild in 1909. It is found in French Guiana, Peru and Amazonas, Brazil.

References

 

intermedia
Moths described in 1909